The James B. Staker House, or Staker House, at 211 N. State St. (on U.S. Route 89) in Mount Pleasant, Utah, was built around 1880.  It was listed on the National Register of Historic Places in 1980.

It is a red brick one-and-a-half-story central passage plan house.  It has a two-tier pedimented portico with Tuscan columns.  It has stylized Italianate paired brackets supporting its cornice. It has a rear T-section with a similar two-tier portico.

References 

National Register of Historic Places in Sanpete County, Utah
Houses completed in 1880